Sir Montagu Lowther Chapman (19 December 1808 – 17 May 1852) was an Anglo-Irish landowner and Member of Parliament (MP).

He was born at Killua Castle, Westmeath, the son of Sir Thomas Chapman, 2nd Baronet and educated at Trinity College, Dublin. He succeeded his father to the baronetcy and the Killua estate in 1837.

Biography
He was elected Member of Parliament for Westmeath in the UK Parliament in 1830, holding the seat until 1841, after which it passed to his brother. In that same year he visited Australia and on 14 June 1842 was granted title to a large estate near Adelaide, which he leased out as smaller farms. Many of the farms were leased to tenants from his own Irish estate, from where 120 people emigrated to Australia. Originally named Montagu's Farm, the area is now known as Gepp's Cross.

He was appointed High Sheriff of Westmeath for 1844.

He was last seen in 1852 on a sea voyage from Melbourne to Sydney, when the vessel in which he was sailing disappeared without trace. He had never married and his Irish and Australian estates were inherited by his younger brother Sir Benjamin James Chapman, 4th Baronet.

See also
List of people who disappeared mysteriously at sea

References

Books

External links 
 

1808 births
1850s missing person cases
1852 deaths
19th-century Anglo-Irish people
Baronets in the Baronetage of Ireland
High Sheriffs of County Westmeath
Members of the Parliament of the United Kingdom for County Westmeath constituencies (1801–1922)
Missing person cases in Australia
People from County Westmeath
People lost at sea
UK MPs 1830–1831
UK MPs 1831–1832
UK MPs 1832–1835
UK MPs 1835–1837
UK MPs 1837–1841
Chapman baronets